Yuri Vladimirovich Kuznetsov (born August 10, 1971, in Novosibirsk, Russia) is a Russian ice hockey coach and former player.

Career Notes 
Yuri Kuznetsov reached the highlight of his career in 2001 when he won the Russian Superleague with Metallurg Magnitogorsk, playing on a line with brothers Aleksandr and Yevgeniy Koreshkov from Kazakhstan. This same year he played for the Russian national team in the 2001 IIHF World Championship.

After two successful seasons with Severstal Cherepovets, he was reunited with the Koreshkov brothers in 2004–2005 at his youth club, the Sibir Novosibirsk but all three players left the club during the season without much success.

His career outside of Russia included 2 seasons for the Syracuse Crunch of the AHL right after he was selected by the Vancouver Canucks in the 7th round of 1994 NHL Entry Draft. He also played for the Minnesota Moose of the IHL, the Kölner Haie of the DEL and the Milano Vipers of the French League.

Coaching career 
In May 2009 PHC Krylya Sovetov announced that Yuri Kuznetsov would be assistant coach to Alexei Kasatonov, the new head coach for the 2009–2010 Vysshaya Liga season, with Vladimir Myshkin being the goaltender coach.

Career statistics

International play
Played for Russia in:

 2001 IIHF World Championship (finished 6th)

International statistics

References

External links

1971 births
Living people
Avangard Omsk players
HC CSKA Moscow players
Metallurg Magnitogorsk players
Metallurg Novokuznetsk players
HC Milano players
HC Sibir Novosibirsk players
Kölner Haie players
Krylya Sovetov Moscow players
Minnesota Moose players
Molot-Prikamye Perm players
Russian ice hockey coaches
Russian ice hockey left wingers
Severstal Cherepovets players
Soviet ice hockey left wingers
Syracuse Crunch players
Torpedo Nizhny Novgorod players
Vancouver Canucks draft picks
Sportspeople from Novosibirsk